NHS is a planned Hospital Ship for the Indian Navy. Under this programme the Indian Navy intends to acquire one ship. Ship under this class will feature advanced medical facilities with a capacity of 250 Beds.

References

Hospital ships
Indian Navy
Proposed ships